Taxation in the British Virgin Islands is relatively simple by comparative standards; photocopies of all of the tax laws of the British Virgin Islands (BVI) would together amount to about 200 pages of paper.

Among the items in the British Virgin Islands that are not subject to taxation:
 no capital gains tax,
 no gift tax,
 no sales tax or value added tax,
 no profit tax,
 no inheritance tax or estate duty, and
 no wealth tax

There is technically still income tax assessed in the British Virgin Islands for companies and individuals, but the rate of taxation has been set at zero. That means that individuals are not obliged to filling obligations on their income tax. However, individuals are subject to a payroll deduction made of up to 8% for employees with additional 2% up to 6% of employer's gross salary paid by employers depending on the category the individuals fall into. There are two categories of employers: "Class 1" and "Class 2" The payroll tax applies to all remunerations/salaries over US$10,000 per annum.

The currency of British Virgin island is US dollar (USD) which makes it easier to interact with the United States Virgin Islands and creates stability and ability to benefit from their reach and reputation they have while still being one of British Overseas Territories. Furthermore, no foreign exchange controls are present. As far as individual taxation is concerned, there are typically certain penalties for not complying with the law. Regarding corporations, there is a system that can be applied to impose penalties in the case of not complying exists. However, both for individuals as well as corporations an official formal ruling or a formal system for tax purposes does not exist.

The absence of most major forms of taxation in the Territory has led to the country being included on most recognised lists of tax havens, although the jurisdiction prefers to style itself as a modern offshore financial centre. The government of British Virgin Islands does not impose any tax on offshore accounts and on top of that, the British Virgin Islands protect the financial security of its clients, account holders. One aspect that the BVI customers can benefit from is the lack of foreign exchange control, resulting in much easier transfers, it also encourages investment and trade while maintaining a protected financial environment and financial privacy.

There are a number of forms of taxation and revenue collection in the British Virgin Islands, but the majority of the Government's revenues are obtained directly from annual licence fees for offshore companies incorporated in the jurisdiction.

Payroll tax
In 2005 the British Virgin Islands introduced a payroll tax in relation to employment and "deemed employment" within the British Virgin Islands. The legislation was brought in at the same time as income tax in the Territory was reduced to zero.  The numbers were not in fact a perfect balance, and the Government (deliberately) reduced the amount of tax revenue it received by moving to the payroll tax system.

The tax is paid at a graduated rate depending upon the size of the employer.  The current rates (as at June 2007) are 10% for small employers and 14% for larger employers.  8% of the total remuneration is deduction from the employee, the remainder of the liability is met by the employer.  The first US$10,000 of remuneration are free from payroll tax.

Stamp duty
Certain limited transactions in the British Virgin Islands are still subject to stamp duty. The main application of the stamp duty legislation relates to transfers of real estate, or transfers of shares in companies which own real estate.  The rate of stamp duty on such transactions varies according to the status of the transferee; if the transferee is a Belonger, then stamp duty on land transfers is assessed at 4%; if the transferee is a Non-Belonger, it is assessed at 12%.

The whole concept of belonging is quite complicated in the British Virgin Islands jurisdiction, but generally, the term refers to either people of the BVI origin or individuals who have been for any reason granted long-term residence. It should not be mistaken for citizenship and similarly, being a Belonger does not grant one a citizenship.

The payment of stamp duty tends to be typically required for instruments rather than transactions. If the particular document that should be properly sealed, has not been sealed appropriately, it cannot be accepted at the Land Registry or cannot be used as documentation in legal matters.

The legislation also includes a number of "rump" taxes that were imposed many years ago and subsist only due to a lack of attention in relation to updating legislation; the amounts involved are tiny, and are never enforced in practice.  For example, charterparties are technically subject to stamp duty at a rate of 50¢ in the British Virgin Islands, but despite the flourishing bareboat charter industry stamp duty is rarely if ever paid by charterers.

Separately, the British Virgin Islands also imposes various documentary duties which are described as being distinct from stamp duty on various classes of instrument:
Cheque duty is assessed at 10¢ on each negotiable instrument (including traveller's cheques) presented for payment within the Territory.
Trust instruments are assessed with trust duty of US$200 (unless they are charitable trusts or bare trusts).
The reason for not referring to these documentary taxes as stamp duty was that under the old International Business Companies Act (Cap 291), companies incorporated under that Act were exempt from stamp duty, and so to retain the payment obligations for those companies, they were referred to as 'cheque duty' and 'trust duty' respectively.

Land tax and house tax
Real estate in the British Virgin Islands is subject to nominal taxation. Because the amounts payable are so small, it is not uncommon for householders to not pay the tax at all, and then discharge all back taxes and penalties when they come to sell their property.  The total tax on residential properties rarely exceeds US$100 per annum.  The tax costs more to collect than it raises. During the Territory's last review of taxation, considerations were made to amend the law to reduce the amount of taxation collection due to a perception that it penalised second home owners (but not to abolish the taxes).

As with stamp duty, land tax rates are considerably higher for foreigners than for Belongers.
Belongers pay annually:
US$10.00 for the first acre, or part thereof, and
US$3.00 for each subsequent acre, or part thereof.
Non-Belongers pay annually:
US$50 for the first half acre, or part thereof,
US$150 for the second half acre, or part thereof, and
US$50 for each subsequent half acre.

House tax is paid at the same rate for all persons, and is it assessed at 1.5% of the annual rental value of the house.  There is a general perception that rental values for owner-occupied homes tend to be assessed as being lower than their actual true market rental value.

Customs duties
Imports into the British Virgin Islands are, subject to certain limited exceptions, subject to import duty. Although this raises a modest amount of government revenue, it tends to be used as a political tool, and to prevent excessive competition with local retailers from the nearby U.S. Virgin Islands.

EU Withholding tax

In common with most British Overseas Territories, the British Virgin Islands had the EU withholding tax imposed upon it in relation to interest payments in the jurisdiction which are payable to natural persons who are resident within the European Union. The withholding tax was not mandatory; depositors can elect not to pay it by agreeing to full disclosure of their account information to the revenue authorities in their country of residence.  The implication is that the withholding tax is only applied to those who are not properly declaring their income in their home countries.  However, payment of the withholding tax does not exempt the income from any applicable income taxes in the home jurisdiction; there is no double taxation relief under the relevant legislation.

The amounts raised by the EU withholding tax to date have been extremely modest. There are two likely reasons for this; firstly, for an Offshore Financial Centre, the British Virgin Islands has an underdeveloped banking infrastructure compared to (for example) the Cayman Islands or Jersey and so comparatively modest sums are deposited in the Territory's banks; secondly, the withholding tax only affects deposits held by natural persons – because most offshore tax structuring involves the use of either an offshore company or an offshore trust, this usually takes it outside the scope of the tax.

The EU Withholding tax was abolished in favor of disclosure of information with effect from 1 January 2012.

Anti-avoidance Rules
British Virgin Islands is a country famous for having very favorable tax policies, earning the title of a tax haven. What contributes to this state is the absence of a transfer pricing rule, a deduction limitation rule or any anti-hybrid rules. The country does not follow any general anti-avoidance rule.

There is a set of commonly named relevant activities, this set includes activities in following branches: banking, insurance, finance and leasing, shipping, holding, distribution, fund management, headquarters, holding, intellectual property and lastly service center. The Economic Substance (ESA) requires all foreign companies, limited partnerships acting in the British Virgin Islands to follow the prescribed requirements by the ESA. In other words, all legal entities must annually provide enough information and documentation so that the International Tax Authority can verify and assess whether the entity is engaged in relevant activities.

The British Virgin Islands does not have any tax treaties. However, it has signed multiple information-exchange agreements, including the Multilateral Convention on Mutual Administrative Assistance in Tax Matters or the Multilateral Competent Authority Agreement on Automatic Exchange of Financial Account Information.

Miscellaneous other taxes
The British Virgin Islands has a number of other minor taxes and levies.  These include:
 Car tax, under the Self-Drive vehicles (Rentals) (Taxation) Act (Cap 210)
 Hotel tax, under the Hotel Accommodation Taxation Act (Cap 205)
 Petroleum income tax, under the Petroleum Income Tax Act (Cap 209)
 Passenger tax, under the Passengers Tax Act (Cap 208)
 A tax is assessed on charterers, although it is characterised as a "permit" under the Cruising Permits Act (Cap 207)

In addition there are a huge number of miscellaneous Governmental fees and charges which are levied pursuant to the Statutory Rates, Fees and Charges Act, 2005.

See also
British Virgin Islands tax law

References

British Virgin Islands
British Virgin Islands law
Economy of the British Virgin Islands